Martyrs is a 2008 psychological horror film written and directed by Pascal Laugier, and starring Mylène Jampanoï, Morjana Alaoui, and Catherine Bégin. It follows a young woman's quest to seek revenge against individuals who abducted and tortured her as a child, and her friend, also a victim of abuse, who agrees to help her; their plot, however, leads to the disturbing revelation of a secret society preoccupied with the creation of "martyrs" through physical torture. 

An international co-production of France and Canada, Martyrs was filmed in Montreal, and screened at the French film market Marché du Film in May 2008, where it incited audience walkouts due to its graphic and disturbing content. It was released theatrically in France on 3 September 2008. The film received polarized reviews from critics, and has been cited by some critics as being part of the New French Extremity movement, an association Laugier denounced.

In 2017, IGN named it one of the best horror films of all time, ranking it number 32 in a list of 100 films, while Rolling Stone included it in a 2021 list of the greatest horror films of the 21st century. 

An American-produced remake of the film bearing the same title premiered in 2015.

Plot
In 1971, young Lucie Jurin escapes from a disused slaughterhouse where she has been imprisoned and tortured for more than a year. She is placed in an orphanage, where she befriends Anna Assaoui, who quickly discovers that Lucie believes she is being tormented by a disfigured, demonic woman.

Fifteen years later, in 1986, Lucie bursts into the home of an apparently normal family, the Belfonds — Gabrielle, her husband, and their two teenage children Marie and Antoine — and kills them with a shotgun. Lucie believes that the parents were involved in her torture as a child. Anna arrives and is horrified by the carnage but ultimately decides to help Lucie clean the crime scene and dispose of the bodies. Anna later discovers Gabrielle alive and tries to help her escape, but Lucie catches them and beats Gabrielle to death with a hammer. Lucie is again attacked by the demonic woman, but Anna only sees Lucie hurting herself; the demonic woman resembles another victim Lucie left behind at the slaughterhouse, and is an ostensible psychological manifestation of Lucie's guilt. Realizing that her act of revenge has failed to alleviate her mental suffering, Lucie slits her own throat.

The following morning, Anna, while on the phone with her estranged abusive mother, discovers a secret passageway in the home's living room, leading to a subterranean chamber. Imprisoned in it is a horrifically brutalised and emaciated woman, proving Lucie was right about the Belfonds. Anna attempts to help the woman, who is hysterical and nonverbal. Anna removes a steel blindfold that has been stapled to the woman's skull and helps give her a bath, only to later find her mutilating her arm with a knife. A group of people arrive at the house, kill the woman, and capture Anna. The group's leader, identified only as Mademoiselle, explains that they belong to a secret society seeking to discover the secrets of the afterlife through the creation of "martyrs". They do this by capturing young women and inflicting on them systematic acts of torture, in the belief that their physical suffering will result in a transcendental insight into the world beyond. So far, the group have only produced "victims" who succumbed to the pain and are unable to speak, but are determined to create martyrs who accept their suffering and report their visions of the afterlife.

Anna becomes the group's latest subject. After a period of being brutally beaten and degraded, she is told that she has progressed further than any other test subject and reached the "final stage." She is flayed alive, a procedure that she survives, and reportedly enters an "ecstatic" state. Mademoiselle arrives eagerly, and Anna whispers into her ear. Members of the society then gather at the house to pay veneration to Anna for her martyrdom, and to hear Mademoiselle's announcement of the groundbreaking testimony. While waiting for Mademoiselle, an assistant asks her from outside her door if what Anna said was clear. She unequivocally confirms and asks him in turn if he can imagine what comes after death. After he says no, Mademoiselle abruptly produces a handgun, tells him to "keep doubting", and kills herself.

An intertitle explains that "martyr" is Greek for "witness" and the film ends with a shot of Anna lying catatonic on a table.

Cast

Analysis
Critic Maitland McDonagh notes that the film contains the theme of the Roman Catholic notions of sainthood and martyrdom in its exploration of spiritual transcendence via physical pain. Laugier himself stated that he intended to make the film's audience "feel real pain" and to "share it as part of an honest process [of] communion...  It was a very Catholic process. I have a very Catholic mind." 

The film's graphic violence resulted in its being associated with the New French Extremity movement, an association Laugier vocally denounced. Literary professor Gwendolyn Audrey Foster similarly challenges the sentiment that Martyrs belongs in this category, writing that its "nihilism is complete and impossible to dismiss, making it a far different experience from other extreme horror films", also citing Laugier's statement that the film exists in a world "in which evil triumphed a long time ago". Foster also notes Laugier's intent to force the film's audience to bear witness to the pain of the violence represented, writing that its viewers "become martyrs in a sense".

Production

Development
Writer-director Pascal Laugier, who had previously made his directorial debut with the supernatural horror film Saint Ange (2005), wrote the screenplay for Martyrs after being inspired by Eli Roth's Hostel (2005), and intended to "make a movie about pain." Laugier stated he was in a severely depressed state at the time of writing the film, and was nearly suicidal. Visually, he was partly inspired by Carl Theodore Dreyer's The Passion of Joan of Arc (1928), and based the film's final shot on a still of the dying Joan of Arc (portrayed by Renée Jeanne Falconetti), an image he pasted to the final page of the screenplay.

On pitching the project, Laugier commented that "the film was rejected by all the big French studios, by a lot of actresses, too. […] The film was really supported by Canal+, the only television channel in France that still finances some unusual projects".

Casting
Mylène Jampanoï, who was cast as Lucie, was drawn to the project after being profoundly affected by the screenplay. "When I chose this movie, my agent told me maybe it’s not a good choice as an actress," she recalled. "You should maybe start with a comedy! But the script was amazing, really amazing. I knew this would be a film that people would either love or hate". Morjana Alaoui, who was cast as Anna, was also attracted to the project after being impressed by its screenplay: "The first time I read the script, I was just like, ‘Wow. I have to be a part of this.' After Pascal cast me as Anna, I started rereading it and every page I was like, ‘Oh my God. How am I going to do this? I’m gonna die'". In preparation for the shoot, Laugier spent two months undertaking rehearsals with Jampanoï and Alaoui.

Filming

Principal photography of Martyrs took place in Montreal, Quebec, Canada. Laugier commented that the main difficulty other than the technical issues such as special effects was to keep the actresses in a heightened emotional state. In order to facilitate this, Laugier kept the two lead actresses isolated from most of the crew.

Jampanoï recalled that she found the shoot emotionally difficult: "Every night when I went back to my room, I just cried, because I was so physically and psychologically tired. All my scenes are violent." Jampanoï also stated that, though she respected Laugier's working style, she found him to be "as short-tempered as me...I have a huge amount of admiration for him... but we did end up clashing". 

The film's special effects were designed by Benoit Lestang, who died by suicide prior to the film's French theatrical release. The film features a mixture of both practical and digital special effects, some of which were completed with the use of green screen.

Release

Controversy and censorship

The film screened at the Marché du Film film market in Cannes in May 2008, inciting walkouts from some audience members. It was subsequently shown on 19 October 2008 at Montreal's Festival du nouveau cinéma. According to Laugier, a man collapsed during the film's screening at the Sitges Film Festival, and a woman vomited during the film's premiere screening in Toronto.

In France, the film faced significant controversy amongst the country's film rating system, which was recorded in a documentary titled Martyrs vs Censorship, directed by Frédéric Ambroisine in June 2008. The French Commission de classification des œuvres cinématographiques initially rated the film 18+ (unsuitable for children under 18 or forbidden in cinemas for persons under 18), which the producers of the film appealed. As a last resort, the French Society of Film Directors (SRF) asked the French ministry of culture to examine the decision, remarking that "this is the first time a French genre film has been threatened with such a rating". The Union of Film Journalists adopted the same position as the SRF, claiming censorship. The Minister of Culture Christine Albanel eventually asked the Commission of Classification to change its rating, which was done in July 2008. Martyrs was finally rated 16+, and released theatrically in France on 3 September 2008.

Recounting the film's rating controversy, Laugier said:

The Weinstein Company purchased North American distribution rights to the film following its screening at Cannes, but producer Bob Weinstein was ultimately so revulsed by the film that they chose not to release it. The film never received a theatrical release in the United States and was instead released directly to DVD. It was given an R rating by the Motion Picture Association for "disturbing/severe aberrant behavior involving strong bloody violence, torture, child abuse and some nudity."

Critical reception
The film was categorized as a new example of new era French horror films akin to Inside with regard to the level of violence it depicts. According to the review-aggregation website Rotten Tomatoes, 64% of 39 critics have given the film a positive review, and an average rating of 6.10 out of 10. The website's critical consensus states, "A real polarising movie, this Gallic torture-porn is graphic, brutal, nasty and gruesome and not to everyone's taste." 

Todd Brown of Screen Anarchy called it "without a doubt the single most divisive film to screen in the Cannes Marché Du Film this year," while Ryan Turek at ShockTillYouDrop said that the film "is the new yard stick against which all forms of extreme genre films should be measured against." The Montreal Gazettes John Griffin awarded the film a three-and-a-half out of four-star rating, describing it as "a film of almost unspeakable horror and sadism [that] is also a cleverly controlled exercise in hardcore terror with a real end in mind".

Critic Maitland McDonagh wrote that the film "has more than can-you-top-this shocks in mind: For all its brutality, Martyrs is conspicuously high minded, rooted in the centuries-old notion that spiritual transcendence lies just beyond the horizon of pain...  You don't have to be Catholic to shudder at Pascal Laugier's Martyrs, but it helps."

Anton Bitel of Britain's Film4 praised the film, saying it "eludes the 'torture porn' label precisely by questioning what those terms might mean, what appeal they might possibly have, and what questions - fundamental, even metaphysical questions – they might answer". Jamie Graham of Total Film called Martyrs "one of the most extreme pictures ever made, and one of the best horror movies of the last decade". He also likened it to "a torture-porn movie for Guardian readers", one that owed as much to Francis Bacon and Raphael as to its genre contemporaries. By contrast, writer and film scholar Jon Towlson says Martyrs''' "political intentions are less overt, more ambivalent and ultimately nihilistic" compared to its contemporaries. "Putting the audience 'through it,'" he says, "is the film's raison d'etre". 

Commenting on the controversy surrounding his film to IndieLondon, director Laugier said he felt "insulted" by many critics' misinterpretations of Martyrs.

Accolades

Home media
Wild Side Video released the film on DVD in France in 2009. In the United States, Genius Products released the film in both unrated and R-rated DVD editions in April 2009. The British distributor Optimum Releasing issued a Blu-ray edition of the film in the United Kingdom the following month in May 2009, and a Canadian Blu-ray followed in 2010 from Entertainment One Films.

On 16 September 2022, the Australian distributor Umbrella Entertainment released a limited special edition region-free Blu-ray edition as part of their "Beyond Genres" series.

Remake

In 2008, Laugier confirmed in an interview that he was in the middle of negotiating the rights for Martyrs to be remade in the United States by director Daniel Stamm. The producer attached at the time, who had previously produced Twilight (2008), indicated that Kristen Stewart was being sought to star in the film, though her involvement with the project was later denied by Stamm. Stamm said "[The original film] is very nihilistic. The American approach [that I'm looking at] would go through all that darkness but then give a glimmer of hope. You don't have to shoot yourself when it's over."
 
In a 2014 interview, Stamm revealed he had left the project after the budget had been reduced, stating, "I think they're now back to making the movie for like $1 million, really low budget, which I think you could almost do, it's just there's this philosophy in Hollywood that you can never go back budget-wise. As a filmmaker you are judged by that. And then there's also this concept I was unaware of called plateauing, where if you're a filmmaker who makes two movies in the same budget bracket, that becomes your thing. You are the guy for the $3 million movie, and then that's all you do. And so my agents wouldn't let me do the $1 million movie, because then that's it for you, you'll supposedly never get that bigger budget".

In February 2015, the new production companies Blumhouse Productions and The Safran Company announced that the film was already filmed and that the Goetz Brothers, Michael and Kevin, had directed. In the leads stars Bailey Noble, Troian Bellisario, Kate Burton and Blake Robbins.  

When asked about the remake, Laugier responded, “I had a bad contract, I didn't even get paid for it! That's really the only thing I regret in my career: That my name is now associated with such a junk film and I didn't even get a cent for it! I tried to watch it but only got through 20 minutes. It was like watching my mother get raped! Then I stopped. Life is too short. In the American system, a movie like ‘Martyrs’ is just not possible - they saw my movie and then turned it into something completely uninteresting.”

Legacy
Several publications have named Martyrs one of the greatest horror films of all time: In October 2017, IGN ranked it number 32 in a list of 100 films, with critic Marty Sliva writing: "Few horror movies elicit as extreme a physical reaction quite like 2008’s Martyrs...  the film transforms into a bizarre religious gore-fest that draws a link between spiritual enlightenment and utterly brutal physical and emotional torture. It’s tough to keep your eyes set on the horrifying images that unfold on-screen, but for those willing to dive into its heady themes, it’s even harder to look away."

In 2021, Rolling Stone'' also ranked it number 36 in their list of the greatest horror films made in the 21st century.

See also
 List of films featuring home invasions
 New French Extremity

References

Sources

External links

 
 
 
 

2008 films
2008 horror films
Canadian films about revenge
Canadian horror films
Canadian independent films
Canadian psychological horror films
Canadian splatter films
French films about revenge
French horror films
French independent films
French splatter films
French psychological horror films
French-language Canadian films
Films directed by Pascal Laugier
Films about child abduction
Films about secret societies
Films set in 1971
Films set in 1986
Films shot in Montreal
Home invasions in film
Human experimentation in fiction
Metaphysical fiction films
Obscenity controversies in film
Religious horror films
Sexual-related controversies in film
Splatterpunk
Torture in films
2000s exploitation films
2000s Canadian films
2000s French films